Franz Dölger (Kleinwallstadt, 4 October 1891 – Munich, 5 November 1968) was a German Byzantinist. He is most notable for his crucial contributions to Byzantine diplomatics, and as the chief editor of the journal Byzantinische Zeitschrift from 1931 to 1963. A member of the Bavarian Academy of Sciences and Humanities, he received honorary doctorates from the universities of Athens, Thessaloniki and Sofia. In 1962, he was awarded the Order Pour le Mérite.

Selected works 
His bibliography up to 1951, which already comprised more than 200 titles counting articles, critical reviews and books only—but nearly 750 if adding short bibliographical notices, entries in the Lexicon für Theologie und Kirche (ed. M. Buchberger, X vols., Freiburg 1930–38), necrologies, and other minor works—was published by

Sources 
 Bernd Rill: Dölger, Franz (1891–1968). in: Rüdiger vom Bruch and Rainer A. Müller (eds.): Historikerlexikon. Von der Antike bis zum 20. Jahrhundert. Beck, Munich 1991, p. 73.

1891 births
1968 deaths
German Byzantinists
Recipients of the Pour le Mérite (civil class)
German male non-fiction writers
Knights Commander of the Order of Merit of the Federal Republic of Germany
Members of the German Academy of Sciences at Berlin
Corresponding Fellows of the British Academy
Scholars of Byzantine history